The body without organs (or BwO; French:  or ) is a philosophical concept used in the work of French philosophers Gilles Deleuze and Félix Guattari. The term was first used by French writer Antonin Artaud in his 1947 play To Have Done With the Judgment of God, later adapted by Deleuze in his book The Logic of Sense as part of a response to psychoanalysis, and ambiguously expanded upon by himself and Guattari in both volumes of Capitalism and Schizophrenia. 

Stemming from ideas of the body and the unconscious in psychoanalysis, Deleuze and Guattari theorized that since the conscious and unconscious fantasies in psychosis and schizophrenia express potential forms and functions of the body that demand it to be liberated, the homeostatic process of the body is limited by organs. Therefore, the body without organs is the unregulated potential of a body without organizational structures imposed on its constituent parts, operating freely. There are three types of the body without organs; the empty, the full, and the cancerous, according to what the body has achieved.

Background 
The phrase "body without organs" was first used by Antonin Artaud, a French writer diagnosed with schizophrenia, in his 1947 text for a play, To Have Done With the Judgment of God. Referring to his ideal for man as a philosophical subject, he wrote in its epilogue that "When you will have made him a body without organs, then you will have delivered him from all his automatic reactions and restored him to his true freedom." He viewed the body as not only a physical structure, but as an impermanent, composite image of actions inflicted upon it; in a 1933 letter he wrote that the body should only be seen as "provisional stratifications of states of life".

Deleuze reinterpreted the term in The Logic of Sense, inspired both by Artaud's text and the work of psychotherapist Gisela Pankow. In this early work, he conceptualized the body without organs in the context of psychoanalysis, observing that the practice as it existed refused the creation of BwOs. In Deleuze's early formulations of the concept, the body without organs was based in the symptoms related to schizophrenia, such as glossolalia where syllables are formlessly uttered and intoned in sets as if they were words. For Deleuze, glossolalia transforms words from having instrumental value (where words have literal meaning) to "values which are exclusively tonic [relating to speech] and not written".

Usage 

The concept was further elaborated upon by Deleuze and his colleague, Félix Guattari, in their volumes of Capitalism and Schizophrenia: Anti-Oedipus and A Thousand Plateaus. Deleuze and Guattari viewed the body as a self-regulating machine (through the process of homeostasis), and as a result, the possible activities of its constituent parts—its organs—were limited.

They wrote that the body without organs is the full potential for the body and its constituent parts; this includes non-human bodies, such as those of animals and plants. Since all organisms have some sort of desire—in the case of plants, their genetic instincts control what actions they take—the body without organs is the unconstrained manifestation of those desires. They viewed the BwO as many different actions that approach an unattainable goal, some of which people are always engaged in. To become a body without organs, one must dispose of stratification (the classification of constituent parts into groups), and instead be filled with intensities (changes in quality). The body without organs is not necessarily coupled with the eradication of stratification, but seeks to "smooth" it out—to transform the body beyond its existing categorization. 

The bodies of schizophrenics, drug addicts, and hypochondriacs are examples they give of bodies without organs, but they caution against replicating their actions; people should not seek out their negative experiences, which are "catatonicized" and "vitrified". While these examples are said to have abandoned stratification, they never intensified, which makes their bodies without organs vulnerable to re-stratification. They classify bodies without organs into three categories: The empty BwO is chaotic and undifferentiated because it undergoes destratification without intensification; the full BwO is, according to Deleuze scholars Niels Albertsen and Bülent Diken, "a plane of consistency" because it is both destratified and intensified, which allows it to enter new relationships; and the cancerous BwO is too stratified and becomes "majoritarian" (having predetermined objectives).

Two important examples of the body without organs relate to eggs. As a bird egg develops, it is nothing but the jumbling about of protein gradients, which have varying intensities and have no apparent structure; for Deleuze and Guattari, a bird egg represents life "before the formation of the strata", since changes in the qualitative elements of the egg will emerge as a changed organism. Relatedly, in the Dogon culture, there is a belief in an egg that encompasses the universe. The universe is then an "intensive spatium" (an intensive interior), similar to a bird egg. According to Deleuze and Guattari, the Dogon egg was crossed with several zig-zagging lines of vibration, changing its shape as it developed.

The body without organs remains one of Deleuze and Guattari's more ambiguous concepts and terms. Over the course of their careers, the term considerably changed meaning, and was used synonymously with others; Deleuze and Guattari were unsure whether they referred to the same concept when using the term. Scholars of Deleuze and Guattari express "little to no agreement" on the term, according to philosopher Ian Buchanan.

In popular culture

See also
Plane of immanence
Desiring-production

Notes and references

Notes

Citations

Bibliography

 
 
 
 
 
 
 
 
 
 
 
 
 
 
 
 
 

Antonin Artaud
Concepts in metaphysics
Félix Guattari
Gilles Deleuze